The term Bible fiction refers to works of fiction which use characters, settings and events taken from the Bible. The degree of fictionalization in these works varies and, although they are often written by Christians or Jews, this is not always the case.

Originally, these novels were consistent with true belief in the historicity of the Bible's narrative, replete with miracles, and God's explicit presence.  Some of these works have been important and influential, and eventually there have appeared heterodox Bible novels that reflect modern, postmodern or realist influences and themes.

An early Bible novel that may still be the most influential is Ben-Hur: A Tale of the Christ by Lew Wallace, and published by Harper & Brothers on November 12, 1880.  It remained the best-selling American novel of all time, surpassing Harriet Beecher Stowe's Uncle Tom's Cabin (1852) in sales and remaining at the top of the US all-time bestseller list until the publication of Margaret Mitchell's Gone with the Wind (1936). Ben-Hur is a bildungsroman and adventure novel that follows the tumultuous life of its protagonist, Judah Ben-Hur. He is a fictional Jewish noble from Jerusalem who suffers betrayal (by a boyhood friend) and consequently his enslavement and his family's imprisonment by the Romans.  Concurrent with Judah's narrative is the developing Christian story, as Jesus and Judah are natives of the same region and about the same age. Judah survives his ordeal and becomes a famous soldier and charioteer, enabling him to avenge his misfortune.  Judah's encounters with Jesus first during Judah's and then during Jesus' suffering lead to the Messiah's curing of Judah's sister and mother of leprosy and Judah's conversion to Christianity. There have been numerous film adaptations including the 1959 version starring Charlton Heston that won ten academy awards.

The Robe (1942) by Lloyd C. Douglas was one of the best-selling novels of the 1940s and dramatizes the crucifixion of Jesus from the point of view of Marcellus Gallio, the Roman tribune who commands the garrison that carries out the crucifixion of Jesus. Marcellus winds up in custody of Jesus' robe and converts to Christianity because of his experiences interacting with the robe's magical powers.  Like Ben-Hur, The Robe was in 1953 adapted into an Academy Award winning film.

In the twentieth century, there began to appear heterodox Bible fiction.  Nikos Kazantzakis' The Last Temptation of Christ (1960), caused a widespread outcry and appeared on many banned book lists for its dramatization of Jesus as wracked by temptations, beset by fear, doubts, depression, reluctance and lust.  However, Jesus is nevertheless portrayed as a miracle-worker and the son of God who is resurrected following the crucifixion.  Norman Mailer's The Gospel According to the Son (1997) is a retelling in Mailer's own words that adheres closely to the Gospel narrative including miracles and resurrection.  This was noteworthy in part because Mailer was a Jew, not a Christian.

Philip Pullman's The Good Man Jesus and the Scoundrel Christ (2010) is a heavily allegorical retelling of the Christian story that uses postmodern techniques and is an evident polemic against Christianity.  It retells the story of Jesus as if he were two people, brothers, "Jesus" and "Christ," with contrasting personalities:  Jesus is a moral and spiritual man, and his brother Christ is an ambitious character who wishes to hijack Jesus' biography and legacy to develop a myth that will be the foundation for a powerful and worldly Church.

Other works are regarded as heterodox simply because they dramatize the Bible stories realistically, shorn of mythical, miraculous or magical elements.  They may even include the transformation from real life events to mythology as part of the narrative.  Realist Bible novels are typically semi-historical in that they develop the setting in Israel or Egypt or Rome or as the case may be—including the political and class and racial conflicts and urban and rural landscape imagery—with fidelity to known historical facts. As Robert Graves said of his novel King Jesus (1946), "I undertake to my readers that every important element in my story is based on some tradition, however tenuous, and that I have taken more than ordinary pains to verify my historical background."

Realist Bible novels employ in some way the narratives that comprise the canonical Biblical narrative, but shorn of miracles, or God's explicit presence.  With respect to Jesus' biography, Jesus is portrayed as a man, usually a rebel against the wealthy classes (sometimes he himself is born into a privileged background and rebels against his own class), and the ruling Romans and their local client autocrats.   Sometimes Jesus' biography is enhanced by sources external to the canonical gospels such as Josephus' chronicles, the Talmud, or non-canonical gospels, and the author's imagination.

Graves' King Jesus develops the protagonist as, not the son of God, but rather as a philosopher with a legitimate claim to be the earthly king of the Jews as a descendant of Herod the Great, and the Old Testament's David.  The novel has heterodox retellings of Biblical stories.

Joseph and His Brothers (1943) is a novel by Thomas Mann that retells the familiar stories of Genesis, from Jacob to Joseph, setting it in the historical context of the Amarna Period. Mann considered it his greatest work.

The Red Tent (1997) a novel by Anita Diamant, is a first-person narrative that tells the story of Dinah, daughter of Jacob and sister of Joseph.  Diamont has broadened her character from her minor and brief role in the Bible.  The book's title refers to the tent in which women of Jacob's tribe must, as dictated by ancient law, be quarantined while menstruating or giving birth. There the women find mutual support and encouragement from their mothers, sisters and aunts.

Pulitzer Prize winner Geraldine Brooks' The Secret Chord (2015) is narrated by Natan, the prophet who communicates God's directives to David.  The scriptures are her primary sources for the plot, which includes all the well-known key events: Goliath, David's facility with the harp, kingdom building, Bathsheba, and so on.  There are other characters fully developed from Brooks' imagination and portrayed through Natan's point of view.

The Testament of Mary (2012) a novella by Colm Toibin, is a retelling of the Christian story from the point of view of Mary, the mother of Jesus. However, she does not believe Jesus is the Son of God – she knows he is a man – and she is contemptuous of the Gospel writers who visit her to solicit her cooperation and give her food and shelter. The themes or questions that the novel explores are narrative truth and fiction, feminism, loss, identity and corruption thereof, invasion of privacy, and worldly ambition. The Testament of Mary was adapted into a Broadway play.

The Liars' Gospel (2012), by Jewish author Naomi Alderman, retells the Christ story from a Jewish perspective.  Four witnesses to the key events, Mary, Judas, Caiaphas and Barabbas, are the narrators in four sections of the novel, and the story spans the period from Pompey's siege of Jerusalem in 63 BC through Titus's siege in 70 AD.

John the Baptizer (2009), by Brooks Hansen and published by W. W. Norton & Company, is a novelized life of John the Baptist that dramatizes the man beneath the hagiography. According to Christian theology, John was merely a forerunner to Christ, but Hansen's portrait is strongly influenced by the Gnostic teachings that reveal John as a messianic figure at the center of an ethnoreligious group called the Mandaeans, and more mature, rigorous and restrained than his younger and charismatic protégé Jesus.

Logos (2015), a novel by John Neeleman and published by Homebound Publications, a small press, and winner of an Independent Publisher Book Awards gold medal for religious fiction and the Utah Book Award for fiction, is a bildungsroman that follows the life and development of the anonymous author of the original gospel.  Jacob, a former temple priest in Jerusalem who has been rendered bereft by the Jewish wars and consequent destruction of his family and culture, is inspired by his own autobiography and Paul's mythmaking to create the canonical gospels' original narrative.

The Gospel According to Lazarus (2019), a novel by Richard Zimler, expands upon the story of Lazarus of Bethany, who was raised from the dead in the Gospel of John. According to Zimler, one of the objectives of his novel was to return to the New Testament figures their Judaism, so in his narrative, Jesus is called Yeshua ben Yosef and Lazarus is called Eliezer ben Natan. Yeshua and Eliezer have been best friends from childhood, and Yeshua is characterized as a Merkabah mystic.  The themes of the book include how we cope with a loss of faith, the terrible sacrifices we make for those we love, the transcendent meaning of Yeshua's mission, and how we go on after suffering a shattering trauma. Reviewing the novel for The Guardian, novelist Peter Stanford called it "a brave and engaging novel...  a page-turner. I simply had to keep going to the very end in order to know on earth what would happen."

See also
 Biblical speculative fiction
 Theological fiction

References

Fiction
 
Christian literary genres